Pierre Kohumoetini (born 18 February 1987) is a Tahitian footballer currently playing for AS Saint-Étienne. He is a member of Tahiti national football team.

International career
Kohumoetini made his debut for the senior team during the 2012 OFC Nations Cup. He appeared in two matches as a substitute.

Honours

Domestic
OFC Nations Cup:
 Winner (1): 2012

International career statistics

External links

http://www.zerozero.pt/jogador.php?id=266601&epoca_id=0&search=1

1987 births
Living people
French Polynesian footballers
Tahiti international footballers
2012 OFC Nations Cup players
Association football midfielders